João Mário Naval da Costa Eduardo  (born 19 January 1993), known as João Mário, is a Portuguese professional footballer who plays as a midfielder for Primeira Liga club Benfica and the Portugal national team.

He started out at Sporting CP in whose youth system he developed, being loaned to Vitória de Setúbal in 2014 and subsequently returning to be an important part of the squads that won major trophies, including the 2015 Taça de Portugal. In 2016 he joined Inter Milan, having loan spells at West Ham United and Lokomotiv Moscow prior to rejoining Sporting, also on loan, in 2020.

João Mário made his senior debut for Portugal in 2014. He was named in the squads for Euro 2016 and the 2018 and 2022 World Cups, winning the 2016 tournament.

Club career

Sporting CP
Following a brief youth spell with local Porto in his hometown, where he was deployed as a central defender, João Mário moved to Sporting CP in 2004 at the age of 11, going on to complete his development with the Lisbon club. On 14 December 2011 he was called for a UEFA Europa League group stage game away against Lazio, alongside youth graduates Betinho, Ricardo Esgaio, Tiago Ilori and João Carlos, as the Lions had already secured the first place in its group: he entered the pitch in the 76th minute of the 2–0 away loss, after replacing Oguchi Onyewu.

João Mário's first full season as a senior was 2012–13, as he appeared in 31 games (30 as a starter) for Sporting CP B in the Segunda Liga, with the team finishing in fourth position. On 8 January 2014 he was loaned to Vitória de Setúbal for the remainder of the campaign, starting in all but one Primeira Liga matches he appeared in and being voted the league's best young player for January and February.

On 31 May 2015, again with Sporting' main squad, João Mário started in the final of the Taça de Portugal against Braga, but was substituted in the first half due to the dismissal of defender Cédric Soares, in order to bring on Miguel Lopes; Sporting eventually won in a penalty shootout.

Inter Milan
On 27 August 2016, João Mário signed with Inter Milan for €40 million plus €5 million in bonuses. His maiden appearance in Serie A occurred on 11 September when he played the full 90 minutes in a 2–1 victory at Pescara, and his first goal for the team opened a loss by the same score at home to Cagliari on 16 October.

Under new manager Luciano Spalletti, João Mário grew increasingly frustrated about the lack of playing time. On 25 January 2018, he signed on loan for Premier League team West Ham United– the contract included a €1.5 million loan fee, and an option for the club to buy the player for a sum in the region of €40 million. He made his debut two days later, replacing Pablo Zabaleta at half-time in a 2–0 away loss to Wigan Athletic in the fourth round of the FA Cup.

João Mário scored his first goal for West Ham on 31 March 2018, helping the hosts defeat Southampton 3–0. He made 14 competitive appearances during his half-season spell, scoring twice, and was praised for his work rate.

On 27 August 2019, João Mário joined Russian club Lokomotiv Moscow on a season-long loan. On 6 October 2020, also on loan, he returned to Sporting. He scored his first goal in his second spell on 27 December, from a penalty to close a 2–1 away win against Belenenses SAD. He contributed another until the end of the campaign (from 28 appearances), helping his team to win the league for the first time in 19 years.

On 12 July 2021, Inter announced they had reached an agreement to early terminate João Mário's contract by mutual consent.

Benfica
João Mário joined Benfica on 13 July 2021, on a five-year deal. He scored his first competitive goal on 10 August, opening the 2–0 home victory over Spartak Moscow in the third qualifying round of the UEFA Champions League.

In the following edition of that tournament, João Mário scored four times in the group stage; this included a first-half penalty in a 2–1 away defeat of Juventus on 14 September 2022, and the sixth goal in the 92nd minute of the 6–1 win at Maccabi Haifa on 2 November that qualified his team as group winners on away goal difference.

International career

Of Angolan descent, João Mário earned 82 caps for Portugal at youth level, including 13 for the under-21 team. He made his senior debut on 11 October 2014, replacing Cristiano Ronaldo for the final 14 minutes of the friendly against France in Paris: soon after coming on, he was fouled by Paul Pogba for a penalty converted by Ricardo Quaresma, in an eventual 2–1 loss.

João Mário represented Portugal at the UEFA European Under-21 Championship in 2015, netting the only goal of their opening group win over England as the tournament ended with a runner-up finish. He was selected by the full side for their UEFA Euro 2016 campaign, starting in the first match, a 1–1 draw with Iceland in Saint-Étienne; he played in all of his team's seven games during Euro 2016, including the final against France which they won.

João Mário scored his first goal for the nation on 10 November 2017, closing the 3–0 friendly defeat of Saudi Arabia. Subsequently, he was included in the final squad for the 2018 FIFA World Cup.

In November 2022, João Mário was named in the squad for the 2022 World Cup in Qatar.

Personal life
João Mário's older brother, Wilson, is also a footballer. He too graduated from Sporting's youth academy.

Career statistics

Club

International

Scores and results list Portugal's goal tally first, score column indicates score after each João Mário goal.

Honours
Sporting CP
Primeira Liga: 2020–21
Taça de Portugal: 2014–15
Taça da Liga: 2020–21
Supertaça Cândido de Oliveira: 2015

Portugal
UEFA European Championship: 2016
UEFA European Under-21 Championship runner-up: 2015

Individual
UEFA European Under-17 Championship Team of the Tournament: 2010

Primeira Liga Midfielder/Player of the Month: December 2022/January 2023

Orders
 Commander of the Order of Merit

References

External links

National team data 

1993 births
Living people
Portuguese sportspeople of Angolan descent
Black Portuguese sportspeople
Portuguese footballers
Footballers from Porto
Association football midfielders
Primeira Liga players
Liga Portugal 2 players
Sporting CP footballers
Sporting CP B players
Vitória F.C. players
S.L. Benfica footballers
Serie A players
Inter Milan players
Premier League players
West Ham United F.C. players
Russian Premier League players
FC Lokomotiv Moscow players
Portugal youth international footballers
Portugal under-21 international footballers
Portugal international footballers
UEFA Euro 2016 players
2018 FIFA World Cup players
2022 FIFA World Cup players
UEFA European Championship-winning players
Portuguese expatriate footballers
Expatriate footballers in Italy
Expatriate footballers in England
Expatriate footballers in Russia
Portuguese expatriate sportspeople in Italy
Portuguese expatriate sportspeople in England
Portuguese expatriate sportspeople in Russia
Commanders of the Order of Merit (Portugal)